This is a list of communes of Luxembourg by lowest point, in order of ascending elevation. Cities are given in italics.

See also
List of communes of Luxembourg by area
List of communes of Luxembourg by highest point
List of communes of Luxembourg by population
List of communes of Luxembourg by population density

References
 Geodata for the Communes of Luxembourg, extracted from OpenStreetMap

Lowest point